Kuttiady is one of the Major towns situated in the north-eastern part of Kozhikode district of Kerala, India. Kuttiady is situated in the slopes of the Western Ghats. 

The four-sided junction of Kuttiady helps travelers to reach different destinations. To the east of Kuttiady is Wayanad district, and the state highway to the north of the Kuttiady junction allows travelers to enter Kannur International Airport and Thalassery.The state highway to the south of the junction helps travelers to reach Calicut. The one and only hydro-electric station in Malabar is situated in Kuttiady River, which flows through the heart of Kuttiady.

History
During the ancient Chera Dynasty, the region was an important military strategic pass to the mountainious terrains of Wayanad.

Kuttiady was ruled by the Kingdom of Kottayam until 1773. During the Pazhassi rebellion (Cotiote War), Kuttiady, which served as one of the major passes to Wayanad, was of great strategic importance. In 1957, the shafts of two golden swords supposed to have been used by Pazhassi Raja were unearthed in Kuttiyadi. 

Kuttiady has a hydroelectric power plant that supplies much of North Malabar with electric power. The region was originally a forest owned by the Vengalil family, but was nationalized following the accession of the communist E.M.S ministry of Kerala.  

The descendants of the famous Zainuddin Makhdoom II family were established in Kuttiady by the Abdullah Kutty Moulavi, known as the Koodakkadavath family.

Economy
Kuttiady is an important agricultural area, with many plantations in nearby villages. The region is famous in Kerala for its high-yielding coconut trees. Important rubber plantations in the area include Manimala estate, Velom, Mangalam estate, and Kunduthode. Areca nut, pepper, coffee, and others are other important cultivating items in the area. There are numerous agricultural based small scale industries like coconut oil production situated in this region.

Kuttiady River (Kuttiady Puzha) 

The Kuttiady River rises from the Narikota Ranges on the western slopes of the Wayanad Hills, a part of Western Ghats at an elevation of  M.S.L.. The river flows through Vatakara, Koyilandy and Kozhikode Taluks. The river is also known as the Murat River and yellow river.

The major tributaries of the river are the Oni puzha, the Nituval puzha, the Katanthra puzha, the Thottilpalam Puzha, the Kadiyangad puzha and the vannathilpuzha. The river passes through Oorakuzhi Kuttiadi, Traveler, Muyippoth, Maniyur, and Karuvacheri. The historical Kottakkal Fort is situated at the mouth of the river.

Kuttiady Dam (Peruvannamuzhi Dam) 

Kuttiady Peruvannamuzhi Dam is a dam in a small village in Kerala. It is situated in the north-east direction of Calicut city. There are many private bus services to the dam. There is an artificial lake in Peruvannamuzhi. Visitors can enjoy boating in Peruvannamuzhi artificial lake. While riding through the artificial lake, there you can see 'Smaraka Thottam', a garden made in the memory of great leaders of freedom struggle. The garden also offers a great enjoyment to you. It also gives you happiness, joy and refreshment.

There is also a crocodile farm and a bird sanctuary situated here at Peruvannamuzhi. There are more than twenty crocodiles here in different pools. The bird sanctuary also offers you with birds of varieties more than 90 species. The Peacocks of Peruvannamuzhi is famous. But it is now considered as vulnerable species.

The Peruvannamuzhi dam belongs to the Kuttiadi irrigation project. The water stored here is used for the production of electricity as well as for irrigation. This Peruvannamuzhi Dam is used for providing water to three main districts- Kozhikode, Malappuram and Kannur.

Peruvannamuzhi Dam also serves water for the famous Japan Govt. Aided Drinking Water Project. Long tunnels runs from here for the purpose of provide drinking water to secluded villages of Kozhikode district.

There is also an institution running here Indian Institution for Spice Research. They were responsible for the production of various varieties of seeds and saplings here. Kuttiady Agricultural farm is also located at Peruvannamuzhi. The tourists can also visit one of the old churches of Kozhikode district, Fathima Matha Catholic Church. The headquarters of Shalom, a popular television channel is also located at Peruvannamuzhi. You could reach here by private bus or by taxi.

The Peruvannamuzhi Dam is also closed on national holidays and Sundays.

 Othiyott, Thalekkara, Kanjaroli, Kodakkal, Accudate, Devar kovil, Paikalangadi, Thottilpalam

Demographics
 India census, Kuttiady had a population of 19351 with 10251 males and 9550 females.In Kuttiady, 12% of the population is under 6 years of age.

Transportation
Kuttiady connects to other parts of India through Vatakara town on the west and Thottilpalam town on the east.  National highway No.66 passes through Vatakara and the northern stretch connects to Mangalore, Goa and Mumbai.  The southern stretch connects to Cochin and Trivandrum.State Highway 38 passes through Kuttiady, which starts from Pavangad at Kozhikode and  passes through Ulliyeri, Perambra, Kuttiady Nadapuram Koothuparamba and endsat Chovva in Kannoor. It is one of the busiest route in the district.   The eastern National Highway No.54 going through Kuttiady connects to Mananthavady, Mysore and Bangalore. The nearest airports are at Kannur and Kozhikode.  The nearest railway station is at Vatakara railway station.
Kuttiady town  have two bus stands old stand and new stand. Old stand situated at kuttiady junction. In which some local route buses starts now like Maruthonkara, Vadakara through Ayancheri, etc. Also there are so many jeep routes starts from there. New bus stand situated at Vadakara road. There are so many major bus routs starts from there like Kuttiady to Kozhokode. Kuttiady-Nadapuram-Vatakara. Kuttiady to Thalassery. Kuttiady to Mananthavady etc. As a hilly area there have so many jeep services.

Political Tensions
Kuttiady among many other eastern regions of the Vatakara taluk had been witnessing political tensions. Few of these tension accompanied with violent vandalism and communal clashes ends up in political killing. Recently Muslim youth league worker Muhammed Aslam was murdered in nearby town Nadapuram, which is believed as retaliation to murder of Tuneri Shibin, 19, a CPI (M) activist. Another Muslim youth league worker was hacked to death allegedly by personal issues this July. It's been regarded as happening out of continuity and transformation of incidents and tensions having existed for a long time, which made this part into a violative region. Police had to enforce prohibitory orders including 144 IPC during violent tensions in regions like Nadapuram, Valayam, Kuttiady and Edachery, often accused of being unable to control situations.

References

External links

Villages in Kozhikode district
Kuttiady area